The Red Sea is a body of water between Africa and Asia, and in the Indian Ocean.

Red Sea may also refer to:
 The Red Sea (EP), a 1999 EP by the band Isis
 Red Sea (Augustus Pablo album), 1998
 Red Sea (Warhorse album), 1972
Red sea, a song by American shoegazing band Asobi Seksu
 Red Sea (state), a state of Sudan, also adjacent to the Red Sea
 Red Sea Governorate, a governorate of Egypt, adjacent to the Red Sea
 Red Sea FC, an Eritrean football club based in Asmara
 The Red Sea, a nickname for Arrowhead Stadium
 Red Sea, a Christian band formed in 1994 (see Die Happy)
 Red Sea Trading Corporation, a company in Eritrea
 Air Djibouti, also known as Red Sea Airlines
 Red Sea, the file system from biblical themed operating system TempleOS
 Dead Cities, Red Seas & Lost Ghosts, a 2003 album by M83

See also
 RED C, Irish market research and opinion polling company 
 Reed Sea, a lake which formerly existed close to the Gulf of Aqaba, but vanished due to the installation of the Suez Canal
 Red tide, an algal bloom which turns water red or brown
 Yam Suph, the body of water traditionally translated as Red Sea in the book of Exodus.